Polona Hercog was the two-time defending champion, but decided to compete at an ITF $100,000 event at Olomouc instead.
World No. 1 Serena Williams won the title, defeating Johanna Larsson in the final, 6–4, 6–1.

Seeds

Draw

Finals

Top half

Bottom half

Qualifying

Seeds

Qualifiers

Qualifying draw

First qualifier

Second qualifier

Third qualifier

Fourth qualifier

External Links
 Main Draw
 Qualifying Draw

Swedish Open - Singles
2013 Women's Singles
2013 in Swedish women's sport